Cobalt(II) bromide (CoBr2) is an inorganic compound. In its anhydrous form, it is a green solid that is soluble in water, used primarily as a catalyst in some processes.

Properties
When anhydrous, cobalt(II) bromide appears as green crystals. It is hygroscopic and forms the hexahydrate in air, which appears as red-purple crystals. The hexahydrate loses four water of crystallization molecules at 100 °C forming the dihydrate:
CoBr2·6H2O   →   CoBr2·2H2O  +  4 H2O

Further heating to 130 °C produces the anhydrous form:
CoBr2·2H2O → CoBr2   +  2 H2O

The anhydrous form melts at 678 °C. At higher temperatures, cobalt(II) bromide reacts with oxygen, forming cobalt(II,III) oxide and bromine vapor.

Preparation
Cobalt(II) bromide can be prepared as a hydrate by the reaction of cobalt hydroxide with hydrobromic acid:

Co(OH)2(s) + 2HBr(aq) → CoBr2·6H2O(aq)

Reactions and uses 
The classical coordination compound bromopentaamminecobalt(III) bromide is prepared by oxidation of a solution of cobalt(II) bromide in aqueous ammonia.
2 CoBr2  +  8 NH3  +  2 NH4Br  +  H2O2   →    2 [Co(NH3)5Br]Br2  +  2 H2O

Triphenylphosphine complexes of cobalt(II) bromide have been used as a catalysts in organic synthesis.

Safety
Exposure to large amounts of cobalt(II) can cause cobalt poisoning. Bromide is also mildly toxic.

References

Cobalt(II) compounds
Bromides
Metal halides